In Greek mythology, the name Myrina, Myrinne or Myrinna may refer to the following individuals:

 Myrina, a queen of the Amazons. According to Diodorus Siculus, she led a military expedition in Libya and won a victory over the people known as the Atlantians, destroying their city Cerne; but was less successful fighting the Gorgons (who are described by Diodorus as a warlike nation residing in close proximity to the Atlantians), failing to burn down their forests. During a later campaign, she struck a treaty of peace with Horus, ruler of Egypt, conquered several peoples, including the Syrians, the Arabians, and the Cilicians (but granted freedom to those of the latter who gave in to her of their own will). She also took possession of Greater Phrygia, from the Taurus Mountains to the Caicus River, and several Aegean islands, including Lesbos; she was also said to be the first to land on the previously uninhabited island which she named Samothrace, building the temple there. The cities of Myrina (in Lemnos), possibly another Myrina in Mysia, Mytilene, Cyme, Pitane, and Priene were believed to have been founded by her, and named after herself, her sister Mytilene, and the commanders in her army, Cyme, Pitane and Priene, respectively. Myrina's army was eventually defeated by Mopsus the Thracian and Sipylus the Scythian; she, as well as many of her fellow Amazons, fell in the final battle.
Myrina, daughter of Cretheus and wife of Thoas, another possible eponym for the city of Myrina on Lemnos.
Myrina, a person whose tomb in Troad is mentioned in the Iliad, see Batea (mythology). Was identified with Myrina the Amazon.
 Myrina, a mythological priestess of Aphrodite who became a myrtle tree.

Notes

References 

 Diodorus Siculus, The Library of History translated by Charles Henry Oldfather. Twelve volumes. Loeb Classical Library. Cambridge, Massachusetts: Harvard University Press; London: William Heinemann, Ltd. 1989. Vol. 3. Books 4.59–8. Online version at Bill Thayer's Web Site
 Diodorus Siculus, Bibliotheca Historica. Vol 1-2. Immanel Bekker. Ludwig Dindorf. Friedrich Vogel. in aedibus B. G. Teubneri. Leipzig. 1888-1890. Greek text available at the Perseus Digital Library.
 Homer, The Iliad with an English Translation by A.T. Murray, Ph.D. in two volumes. Cambridge, MA., Harvard University Press; London, William Heinemann, Ltd. 1924. . Online version at the Perseus Digital Library.
 Homer, Homeri Opera in five volumes. Oxford, Oxford University Press. 1920. . Greek text available at the Perseus Digital Library.
 Realencyclopädie der Classischen Altertumswissenschaft, Band XVI, Halbband 31, Molatzes-Myssi (1933), s. 1095-1097 
 Stephanus of Byzantium, Stephani Byzantii Ethnicorum quae supersunt, edited by August Meineike (1790-1870), published 1849. A few entries from this important ancient handbook of place names have been translated by Brady Kiesling. Online version at the Topos Text Project.
 Strabo, The Geography of Strabo. Edition by H.L. Jones. Cambridge, Mass.: Harvard University Press; London: William Heinemann, Ltd. 1924. Online version at the Perseus Digital Library.
 Strabo, Geographica edited by A. Meineke. Leipzig: Teubner. 1877. Greek text available at the Perseus Digital Library.

Queens of the Amazons
Women in Greek mythology